Seyfabad (also Romanized as Seyfābād) is a village in Azna Rural District, in the Central District of Khorramabad County, Lorestan Province, Iran. At the 2006 census, its population was 593, in 110 families.

References 

Towns and villages in Khorramabad County